Kämmerling is a German surname, related to Kammer, meaning "chamber". Spelling variants are Kammerling and Kemmerling.

Kämmerling
Karl-Heinz Kämmerling, (1930–2012), German pianist and academic teacher
Maria Kämmerling (born 1946), German classical guitarist

Kammerling
Anna-Karin Kammerling, (born 1980), Swedish swimmer

Kemmerling
Andreas Kemmerling, founder of the European Society for Analytic Philosophy
Jan Gerard Kemmerling, (1776–1818), mayor
Julie Kemmerling, Miss Iowa 1988
Michael Kemmerling, actor
Warren J. Kemmerling, actor

See also
Kammerer

Surnames